Aṅgulimāla is an important early figure in Buddhism.

Angulimala or Angulimaal may also refer to:
Angulimaal (film), a 1960 Indian drama film
Angulimala (1988 film), a Sri Lankan film
Angulimala (2003 film), a Thai drama film
Angulimala (2013 film), an Indian Kannada drama film

See also
Aṅgulimālīya Sūtra, a part of the Mahāyāna Buddhist Tathāgatagarbha discourses